Ernodesmis is a genus of green algae in the family Siphonocladaceae.

References

External links

Cladophorales genera
Siphonocladaceae